This is a list of Arctic research programs:

 Arctic and Antarctic Research Institute
 Arctic and Northern Studies at University of Alaska Fairbanks
 Arctic Centre, University of Lapland
 The Arctic Institute | Center for Circumpolar Security Studies
 Arctic Institute of North America
 Arctic Research Consortium of the United States
 Arctic Research Foundation
 Arctic Research Office
 Arctic Submarine Laboratory
 Arctic Technology Centre
 Association of Polar Early Career Scientists (APECS)
 Byrd Polar Research Center
 Canadian High Arctic Ionospheric Network
 Centre for Polar Observation & Modelling
 Circumarctic Environmental Observatories Network
 Cooperative Institute for Arctic Research
 EISCAT
 Flashline Mars Arctic Research Station

 Institute of Arctic and Alpine Research
 Institute of Arctic Biology
 International Arctic Buoy Program
 International Arctic Research Center
 International Arctic Science Committee
 National Centre for Polar and Ocean Research
 North Greenland Ice Core Project
 National Snow and Ice Data Center
 QUEEN
 
 SCICEX
 Scott Polar Research Institute
 Surface Heat Budget of the Arctic Ocean
 United States Arctic Research Commission
 University of the Arctic

See also
List of research stations in the Arctic

 
Research programs
Research-related lists